Raymond Kibet (born February 4, 1996) is a Kenyan sprinter specializing in the 400m.

He won gold at the 2015 African Games as part of the 4x400 metre relay team.

Additionally, he was a finalist and finished 7th the 2015 African Games in the 400 metres. He competed at the 2016 Summer Olympics.

References

External links

Kenyan male sprinters
1996 births
Living people
Athletes (track and field) at the 2015 African Games
Athletes (track and field) at the 2016 Summer Olympics
Olympic athletes of Kenya
African Games gold medalists for Kenya
African Games medalists in athletics (track and field)
World Athletics Championships athletes for Kenya
Athletes (track and field) at the 2019 African Games